Lövő is a village in Sopron District of Győr-Moson-Sopron County in Hungary.

External links 
 Street map 

Populated places in Győr-Moson-Sopron County